Jamie Nagle (born 26 October 1990) is an Irish hurler who plays for club side Midleton. He is a former member of the Cork senior hurling team.

Career

A member of the Midleton club, Nagle first came to prominence at juvenile and underage levels while simultaneously playing with Midleton CBS in the Harty Cup. After captaining Midleton to the Cork U21HC title in 2011, he later won a Cork SHC title in 2013. Around this time Nagle also won consecutive Fitzgibbon Cup titles with University College Cork. He later linked up with the Midleton intermediate team. Nagle first appeared on the inter-county scene during an unsuccessful two-year stint with the Cork under-21 hurling team. He made his senior team debut in the pre-season Waterford Crystal Cup in 2010 and was included on the championship panel the following year.

Career statistics

Honours

University College Cork
Fitzgibbon Cup: 2012, 2013

Midleton
Cork Senior Hurling Championship: 2013
Cork Under-21 Hurling Championship: 2011 (c)

References

1990 births
Living people
UCC hurlers
Midleton hurlers
Cork inter-county hurlers